Bury Castle near Brompton Regis in the English county of Somerset was an Iron Age univallate hillfort which was reused with the creation of a motte after the Norman Conquest. It has been scheduled as an ancient monument.

Iron Age fort

It is an oval enclosure just above the confluence of the River Haddeo and River Exe.

Medieval period
In the late 1130s, a civil war, known as the Anarchy, broke out in England between the supporters of King Stephen and the Empress Matilda. A motte and bailey castle was built on the Bury Castle side, probably by William de Say. In 1198 Richard I confirmed that Brompton should be part of the inheritance of Matilda.

References

Castles in Somerset
Hill forts in Somerset
Scheduled monuments in West Somerset